This is a list of schools within the Royal Air Force, including the empire flying training scheme, civilian and service elementary training schemes, and gliding schools.

Schools
The Royal Air Force operated many schools to train aircrew in the many and various skills required to operate an air force.

Flying training schools
To train pilots for the Royal Air Force, there have been many flying training schools, which are listed here.

Numbered schools

Other schools

Gliding schools

As well as powered aircraft, the Royal Air Force has operated a large number of gliders both for military tasks and for Cadet training.

Regular Gliding Schools

Volunteer Gliding Schools

 Central Gliding School

See also

Royal Air Force

List of Royal Air Force aircraft squadrons
List of Royal Air Force aircraft independent flights
List of conversion units of the Royal Air Force
List of Royal Air Force Glider units
List of Royal Air Force Operational Training Units
List of Royal Air Force units & establishments
List of RAF squadron codes
List of RAF Regiment units
List of Battle of Britain squadrons
List of wings of the Royal Air Force
Royal Air Force roundels

Fleet Air Arm

List of Fleet Air Arm aircraft squadrons
List of Fleet Air Arm groups
List of aircraft units of the Royal Navy
List of aircraft wings of the Royal Navy

Others

List of Air Training Corps squadrons
University Air Squadron
Air Experience Flight
Volunteer Gliding Squadron
United Kingdom military aircraft serial numbers
United Kingdom aircraft test serials
British military aircraft designation systems

References

Citations

Bibliography
 Halley, James J. The Squadrons of the Royal Air Force & Commonwealth 1918–1988. Tonbridge, Kent, UK: Air Britain (Historians) Ltd., 1988. .
 Jefford, C.G. RAF Squadrons, a Comprehensive record of the Movement and Equipment of all RAF Squadrons and their Antecedents since 1912. Shropshire, UK: Airlife Publishing, 1988 (second edition 2001). .
 

Training establishments of the Royal Air Force
Schools